Amalie Moses Kass (January 9, 1928 - May 19, 2019) was an American historian at Harvard Medical School. She wrote about obstetrics and midwifery.

Biography
Amalie Moses was born to Leslie and Helene Moses and reared in Baltimore, Maryland, where she attended Forest Park High School.  She attended Wellesley College and graduated in 1949, with high honors in history, and was a member of Phi Beta Kappa.  She received her master's degree in education in 1963 from Boston University. She had two younger siblings, a brother Alfred H. Moses and a sister Claire Moses Lovett. She had lived in Cambridge, Lincoln, and Belmont, Massachusetts.

In 1949, she married Malcolm (Mac) Hecht Jr., with whom she had five children: Anne, Robert, Thomas, Jonathan, and Peter Hecht. The animal carousel for children in the Rose Fitzgerald Kennedy Greenway is named for Mac Hecht because of her 2013 donation.
In 1975, following Mac's death in 1973, she married Dr. Edward Kass and became stepmother to his three children: Robert, James, and Nancy Kass.

Books and articles

Author of two medical biographies
 Midwifery and Medicine in Boston: Walter Channing, M.D., 1786–1876, Northeastern University Press, 2002
 Perfecting the World: The Life and Times of Thomas Hodgkin, MD (co-author with Edward Harold Kass), Harcourt Brace Jovanovitch, 1988

Author of numerous journal articles and encyclopedic entries including
 A Brief History of the Channing Laboratory
 My brother preaches, I practice Walter Channing, M.D., Antebellum Obstetrician
 Walter Channing Brief life of a nineteenth-century obstetrician 1786-1876

Professional work
 Associate editor, Journal of the History of Medicine and Allied Sciences (1996)
 Lecturer on the history of medicine, Harvard Medical School (1991)
 Research associate, Countway Library of Medicine, Harvard Medical School (1982)
 History teacher, Newton High School and Newton South High School (1963–1979)

Major volunteer activities
 President of the Massachusetts Historical Society (2002 – ).
 Lincoln Rural Land Foundation Trustee (200? - present)
 Wellesley College Trustee (1992–2007)
 President of the Women's Institute for Housing and Economic Development

Honors
 The Amalie Moses Kass Professorship of History of Medicine in the Department of Global Health and Social Medicine at Harvard Medical School

References

1928 births
Writers from Baltimore
Wellesley College alumni
Boston University School of Education alumni
Harvard Medical School faculty
2019 deaths
People from Cambridge, Massachusetts
People from Belmont, Massachusetts
People from Lincoln, Massachusetts
People from Baltimore
Medical historians